

Events
Former Five Points Gang members Nathan Kaplan and Johnny Spanish,  are released from prison. They form a criminal gang together, made up mostly of ex-Five Pointers, to take the place of now imprisoned labor racketeers Benjamin "Dopey Benny" Fein and Joseph "Joe the Greaser" Rosenzweig.

Al Capone

It was through the Five Points gang that Al Capone came to the attention of brutal New York mobster Frankie Yale. In 1917, 18-year-old Al Capone went to work for Yale at the Harvard Inn as a bartender and as a waiter and bouncer when needed. Capone watched and learned as Yale used violence to maintain control over his empire.

One day while working at the Harvard Inn, Capone saw a man and woman sitting at a table. After his initial advances were ignored, Capone went up to the good-looking woman and whispered in her ear, "Honey, you have a nice ass and I mean that as a compliment." The man with her was her brother, Frank Gallucio. Defending his sister's honor, Gallucio punched Capone. However, Capone didn't let it end there; he decided to fight back. Gallucio then took out a knife and slashed at Capone's face, managing to cut Capone's left cheek three times (one of which cut Capone from ear to mouth). The scars left from this attack led to Capone's nickname of "Scarface," a name he personally hated.

Births
May 24 – Anthony Provenzano "Tony Pro", Genovese Crime Family Caporegime and New Jersey labor union racketeer

References

Organized crime
Years in organized crime